Imre Oltványi (20 February 1893 – 13 January 1963) was a Hungarian politician, who served as Minister of Finance in 1945 in the Interim National Government. He studied at the University of Budapest. Between 1920 and 1921 he was the secretary of the National Agriculture Association. He was a founding member of the Smallholders' Party. Towards the end of the Second World War he participated in resistant movements against the Arrow Cross Party government.

After the war he was appointed head of the National Bank of Hungary. After his short ministership he served in this position again. Oltványi was member of the National Assembly between 1945 and 1947. He served as ambassador to Switzerland between 1947 and 1948. After that he was the director of the Hungarian National Museum until 1950 and of the Museum of Fine Arts until 1952.

References
 Magyar Életrajzi Lexikon

1893 births
1963 deaths
People from Bács-Kiskun County
Finance ministers of Hungary
Governors of the Hungarian National Bank
Ambassadors of Hungary to Switzerland